Hustler or hustlers may also refer to:

Professions
 Hustler, an American slang word, e.g., for a:
 Con man, a practitioner of confidence tricks
 Drug dealer, seller of illegal drugs
 Male prostitute
 Pimp
 Business man, more generally, possibly self-employed or self-made
 Hustler, someone who deceives others by hustling, usually in sports

Arts, entertainment, and media

Films
 The Hustler (1920 film), a German silent film starring Hans Albers
 The Hustler, a 1961 American film adaptation of the Tevis novel starring Paul Newman as Felson
 The Hustlers (film), a 2010 Finnish comedy film
 Hustlers, an alternate name of the 2013 film Pawn Shop Chronicles
 Hustlers (film), a 2019 American crime drama film starring Constance Wu and Jennifer Lopez

Music
 "Hustler" (song), a 2006 house music single by Simian Mobile Disco 
 "Hustler", a song by Kano on the album 140 Grime St
 "Hustla", 2019 single by Kash Doll
 "Hustlers", a song from the 2006 album Hip Hop Is Dead by American rapper Nas
 The Hustler (album), a 1968 salsa album by Willie Colón
 The Hustlers, performers on the soundtrack for the 1965 horror film The Beach Girls and the Monster

Other uses in arts, entertainment, and media 
 Hustler (magazine), a men's pornographic magazine published by Larry Flynt Publications
 Hustler Club, a chain of bars and go-go clubs using the brand name licensed by Larry Flynt
 The Hustler, English title of a 1926 German novel by John Henry Mackay
 The Hustler (novel), a 1959 American novel by Walter Tevis about pool hustler Edward "Fast Eddie" Felson
 "The Hustler" (Porridge), an episode of the BBC sitcom Porridge
 The Hustler, a 1950s painting by the American artist Arthur Sarnoff (1912–2000)
 The Hustler (American game show), a 2021 television program hosted by Craig Ferguson

Transportation and vehicles 
 Hustler, a train of the Southern Pacific, between Dallas and Houston
 Marine Heavy Helicopter Squadron 772, a US Marines unit nicknamed "The Hustlers"

Airplanes 
 Convair B-58 Hustler, an American supersonic jet bomber that first flew in 1956
 Gulfstream American Hustler, a small American aircraft produced from 1978 to 1981

Automobiles and motorcycles 
 Hustler (car), a kit car designed in 1978
 Hustler, a line of car wheels manufactured by American Racing in the 2000s
 Hustler, motorcycles produced by American firm Rupp Industries in the early 1970s 
 Hustler, a line of Suzuki motorcycles produced from 1965 to 1981

Other uses 
 Hustler, Wisconsin, a village in Juneau County, Wisconsin, United States
 William Hustler (1655–1730), English draper (cloth retailer)
 Hustler Casino, Gardena, California, USA

See also 

 Melvin Flynt – Da Hustler (aka "Da Hustler", "Hustler"), 1999 album by Noreaga
 Hustler Magazine v. Falwell
 Hustle (disambiguation)
 
 
 Shyster
 Flynt (disambiguation), including other Larry Flynt-Hustler topics